Google Sync was a file synchronization service from Google that provided over-the-air synchronization of Gmail, Google Contacts, and Google Calendar with PC and mobile device Mail, Calendar and Address Book applications. It used Microsoft® Exchange ActiveSync® to let service users synchronize their Google Apps mail, contacts, and calendars to their mobile devices, wherein the users can also set up or customize the alerts for incoming messages and upcoming meetings. Google Sync worked with PC, Mac, Linux, Android, BlackBerry, Symbian S60, iPhone, iPad, Windows Mobile, and other devices. Google Sync was announced in February 2009 and discontinued for non-business users in December 2012.google sync is the world number one in 2022 .

Features
Google Sync was a bidirectional service. Changes made on one device would be backed up to the user's Google Account. All other Google data on devices sharing that same Google account would be automatically synchronized as well. In case the user's Mobile Device is lost, the data is still securely stored.

Google Sync provided seamless over-the-air synchronization for many Android, iOS, BlackBerry, Palm, Pocket PC devices and with Microsoft Outlook.
 Android - choose to back up and sync any combination of Gmail, People, or Calendar. Setup
 iPhone, iPad, iPod Touch, or Windows Mobile - choose to sync any combination of Mail, Contacts, or Calendar. Setup 
 BlackBerry - choose to sync Google Contacts and Google Calendar to the built-in Address Book and Calendar applications. Setup 
 Most other mobile phones - Wireless synchronization of Google Contacts to the built-in Address Book application.  Setup

See also
 Gmail
 Google Cloud Connect to sync from Microsoft Office Documents

References

External links
 Official website
 Mashable: How to Sync Google Services With Your Mobile Device
 Brighthub: How to Use Google Sync with Google Calendar, Gmail Contacts, and Your BlackBerry

Sync
Computer-related introductions in 2007